Richard Wawro (14 April 1952 – 22 February 2006) was a Scottish artist notable for his landscapes in wax oil crayon. He was an autistic savant.

Life
Wawro was the son of Tadeusz and Olive Wawro; his father was a Polish military officer and civil engineer who had settled as a librarian in Fife, and his mother a Scottish schoolteacher. He was diagnosed as "moderately to severely retarded" at the age of three, a condition later recognised as autism. He did not learn to speak before the age of 11 and required eye surgery to remove cataracts, which left him with sufficiently poor eyesight to be classed as legally blind.

As a toddler, Wawro began to draw on a chalkboard. In the local children's centre at the age of six he began to use crayons, and his talent was recognised soon after. Professor Marian Bohusz-Szyszko of the Polish School of Art, London, said he was "thunderstruck" at Wawro's drawings, describing them as "an incredible phenomenon rendered with the precision of a mechanic and the vision of a poet".

He had his first exhibition in Edinburgh when he was 17.

In the early 1970s one of his exhibitions was opened by Margaret Thatcher, then Education Minister, who bought several of his pictures, as did John Paul II.

He got his father's approval for each picture until his father died in 2002. Overall he sold more than 1,000 pictures in around 100 exhibitions.

His original art was first introduced in the United States in 1977 at a National Council of Teachers of English conference on Creativity for the Gifted and Talented in New York City. In 1983 his life and work were the subject of an international, award-winning documentary film, With Eyes Wide Open, by the autism expert Laurence A.Becker, Ph.D. who also produced a video profile of him, A Real Rainman.

Wawro died of lung cancer in 2006.

Works
Wawro worked in the unusual medium of wax oil crayon, specialising in landscapes and seascapes that were acclaimed for their highly detailed and dramatic images of intense depth and colour. He used no models, but drew from images seen only once, such as in books or on television; his phenomenal memory enabled him to recall where he drew each picture and to date it precisely in his mind. Although possessing perfect recall, he often added his own touches to the images. He was particularly inspired by light, and the tones he used to capture light and shadows are considered masterly.

See also
Stephen Wiltshire

References

External links
 Wawro's website
 Biography
 Gallery Images of a selection of his paintings

1952 births
2006 deaths
20th-century Scottish painters
Scottish male painters
21st-century Scottish painters
21st-century Scottish male artists
Autistic savants
Deaths from lung cancer
Outsider artists
People from Newport-on-Tay
Scottish people of Polish descent
Artists with autism
20th-century Scottish male artists